Storl and Störl are surnames of German origin. Notable people with the surnames include:

Dennis Störl (born 1979), German ski jumper
David Storl (born 1990), German shot putter
Wolf-Dieter Storl (born 1942), German cultural anthropologist

German-language surnames